Angelo & Veronica are an American urban contemporary gospel music husband and wife duo from Boston, Massachusetts, and they started their music recording careers in 1992. The duo released nine albums with five labels, with two of those albums charted on the US Billboard Christian Albums chart.

Background
The duo has its origins in Boston, Massachusetts, with the American born who is of Italian ancestry, Angelo Petrucci Jr., and his father a guitarist professionally and mother was a pianist who happened to be employed at a radio station. He began doing shows at 13 years old, when he dad was sick and could no longer perform. Angelo's parents became Christians, when he was a teenager, and they slowly influenced him with Commissioned's "Running Back to You". During college at Berklee College of Music, Angelo was in a secular band, playing shows at bars, and he did this throughout his college and for about a decade after college. Until Veronica Beth Torres, a Latina, also of Berklee College of Music, had a chance encounter with him at one of his bar performances, and they subsequently became close professionally and personally. She is from New York City's borough The Bronx, but spent some of her life being raised in New Jersey and Puerto Rico. They were doing secular music shows, until their faith strengthened, and they started to pursue a Christian and gospel music recording career. They would eventually marry becoming a husband and wife duo.

History
The husband and wife duo commenced their recording careers in 1992, with the album, Higher Place, and it was released on September 8, 1992, by A&M Records. This album was coincidentally their breakthrough release upon the Billboard magazine Christian Albums chart, and it placed at No. 35. They would release eight more albums mostly with Benson Records, but those failed to chart. The duo would release two albums, one each with Zomba Records and Harmony Records, and those did not chart, as well. Angelo & Veronica would release two albums with Verity Records, and Give Your Life charted on the aforementioned chart at No. 39.

Members
 Angelo Petrucci Jr. (born 1959)
 Veronica Beth Petrucci (née Torres) (born 1969)

Discography

References

External links
 Official website
 Cross Rhythms artist profile

American musical duos
Musical groups established in 1992
Musical groups from Boston